Juhamatti Yli-Junnila (born January 29, 1981) is a Finnish former professional ice hockey centre.

Yli-Junnila played 274 regular season games in the SM-liiga for HPK and Lukko between 2002 and 2008. He also had loan spells in Mestis for FPS and KooKoo as well as a permanent move to Hokki in 2009.

He played in the inaugural IIHF World U18 Championship in 1999 for Finland, winning a gold medal.

References

External links

1981 births
Living people
Asplöven HC players
Corsaires de Dunkerque players
ETC Crimmitschau players
Fehérvár AV19 players
Finnish ice hockey centres
Fischtown Pinguins players
Hockey Club de Reims players
Hokki players
HPK players
KooKoo players
Lukko players
People from Salo, Finland
Sportspeople from Southwest Finland